Columbia Cemetery may refer to:
 Columbia Cemetery (Boulder, Colorado), listed on the NRHP in Colorado
 Columbia Cemetery (Columbia, Missouri), listed on the NRHP in Missouri
Columbia Baptist Cemetery, Cincinnati, Ohio, listed on the NRHP in Ohio